Glücksburg Castle (German: Schloss Glücksburg, Danish: Lyksborg Slot) is one of the most significant Renaissance castles in Northern Europe. The castle was the headquarters of the ducal lines of the house of Glücksburg and temporarily served as the primary residence of the Danish monarch. The building is in the town of Glücksburg, located in Northern Germany on the Flensburg Firth. The structure is a water castle. The ducal house of Glücksburg derived its name from the castle and its family members are related to almost all European dynasties.

Nowadays, the castle is one of the most famous sights in the German state of Schleswig Holstein. Within the castle is a museum which is open to the public.

Glücksburg Castle

History

From the Ryd Abbey to Glücksburg Castle 
The history of today's castle grounds began in Schleswig in 1192, when the double monastery of St. Michael auf dem Berge was dissolved. The nuns then moved to the St. John's Monastery in Schleswig, which still exists today, while the monks left the place and went to Guldholm on Langsee. Between 1209 and 1210 the monks founded a new Cistercian monastery in Glücksburg. In the vicinity of the monastery was an older motte-and-bailey castle, parts of which have been preserved to this day. The so-called Ryd Abbey and the extensive estates were inhabited and managed by the monks in the following centuries. At the same time, the neighboring town Flensburg still had several castles, as well as the large, militarily important Duburg fortress, built in 1411. In the course of the Reformation, the Rüdekloster was secularized in 1538 and came into the possession of the Danish King Christian III in 1544. The monastery buildings served as the administrator's residence. In the beginning of the 16th century, the condition of the Duburg fortress in Flensburg began to decline.

The ancestral seat of the elder line 

The history of the castle itself begins in 1582. The Danish King Frederick II encumbered his brother John, known as Hans the Younger, with the lands of Sundewitt, the Reinfeld monastery and the old Ryd Abbey, amongst other things. John, who already had considerable possessions, acquired additional areas. The government of the duchy was largely in the hands of John's brother. Although John was a partitioned-off duke, because the estates refused him homage, he tried to increase his fortune and his reputation in other ways. He worked successfully as an early mercantilist entrepreneur. As a typical duke of his time, he expressed his wealth with various buildings and founded, among other things, the castles in Reinfeld and Ahrensbök, which have since been demolished. He modernized the Sønderborg Castle and in 1582 began building Glücksburg castle, where the Ryd Abbey used to be. The castle was built to serve as a comfortable country castle for himself and his family.

After John's death in 1622, the duchy of Schleswig-Holstein-Sonderburg was divided amongst his heirs. John's son Philipp received the castle and the lands of Glücksburg and thus founded the first, the elder line of the House of Schleswig-Holstein-Sonderburg-Glücksburg. The castle remained the seat of the Dukes of Glücksburg for over 150 years, but the small titular duchy itself remained relatively insignificant. Apart from the fact that the members of the house were repeatedly married into other noble families, they played no role in the history of the country. During this time, the Glücksburg castle was more of a continuously inhabited noble family seat and less of a courtly residence. In the middle of the 17th century, the palace and its outbuildings housed a court of an average of 80 people.

Descendants of John († 1622) who resided Glücksburg Castle after his death:

 Philipp (Schleswig-Holstein-Sonderburg-Glücksburg), † 1663
 Christian (Schleswig-Holstein-Sonderburg-Glücksburg), † 1698
 Philipp Ernst (Schleswig-Holstein-Sonderburg-Glücksburg), † 1729
 Friedrich. (Schleswig-Holstein-Sonderburg-Glücksburg), † 1766
 Friedrich Heinrich Wilhelm (Schleswig-Holstein-Sonderburg-Glücksburg), † 1779

With the death of the childless Friedrich Heinrich Wilhelm in 1779, the older branch of the family went extinct and the Glücksburg fief went back to the Danish royal family. Until 1824 the wife of the last Duke, Anna Carolina used the castle as a widow's residence.

The ancestral seat of the younger line 

in 1825, The Danish King Frederick VI handed over the fief and thus the castle and title to his brother-in-law Friedrich Wilhelm from the Holstein-Beck family. Friedrich Wilhelm assisted the Danish king during the Congress of Vienna and was accordingly rewarded with the Ducal title. Raised in Denmark and Prussia, the new duke was a direct descendant of the palace's builder, John III. Together with his wife, Louise Caroline, a daughter of the ducal governor Charles von Hessen-Kassel, he founded the younger line of the House of Glücksburg. Friedrich Wilhelm no longer lived in the castle himself; however, his wife resided here until the first Schleswig War. Among their ten children was the later Danish king Christian IX. – the progenitor of today's Glücksburg line on the Danish throne.

The Danish royal family often used their relatives' castle as a summer residence. From 1854, King Frederick VII occasionally resided at Glücksburg, until he died childless here in 1863. According to the London Protocol of 1852, Christian IX. of the Glücksburg line became his successor. Under him, the castle gained a reputation as the cradle of Europe, and the new king was often referred to as Europe's father-in-law. From Christian's marriage to Princess Louise of Hesse, three daughters were married into the royal houses of England and Russia: Alexandra married the later Edward VII, Dagmar the later Tsar Alexander III and the youngest daughter Thyra the Duke of Cumberland. The second son became King George I of Greece and the grandson Carl became King of Norway. From this time forward, the House of Glücksburg is related to almost all major European dynasties.

In the possession of Wilhelm I 
During the Second Schleswig War in 1864, the castle served as quarters for Charles von Prussia and was later even used as a hospital and barracks. With the war, the long personal union of the Danish royal family and the Schleswig-Holstein duchies ended, and the castle passed into Prussian ownership. On September 16, 1868, the Prussian King Wilhelm I visited the castle during a visit to Flensburg to decide on its future fate and use.

The Flensburger Nachrichten newspaper reported on September 22: "[...] Glücksburg had festively adorned itself for the arrival of the king; There were three gates of honor, one at Ruhethal, the second in front of the entrance to the town, the third at the driveway to the castle, and flags and floral decorations in abundance. The king arrived the 16th, at 3 p.m., at the second gate of honor, Pastor Vogel gave a brief address, which the monarch graciously returned. A few peasant girls had gathered at the castle to offer the father of the country butter, bread, cheese and fruit as well as fishing products. [...] The whole stay in the village and at the castle lasted only a small hour. "

King Wilhelm I showed no further personal interest in the property and the War Ministry no longer needed it. In 1869, King Wilhelm I transferred the castle back to the ducal family by means of a "highest decree".

Return of the ducal family 

Duke Karl , a brother of King Christian IX, used the palace again as a permanent residence from 1871. When he moved in, he and his wife Wilhelmine were welcomed by the Friedrichsgarde. Since then, the castle has remained in the possession of the Glücksburg family and was inhabited by the family and relatives at almost all times.

The following resided here as descendants of Duke Karl († 1863):

 Friedrich (Schleswig-Holstein-Sonderburg-Glücksburg), † 1885
 Friedrich Ferdinand (Schleswig-Holstein-Sonderburg-Glücksburg), † 1934

One of the most famous regular guests was Auguste Viktoria, the last German Empress, who came from the closely related house of Schleswig-Holstein-Sonderburg-Augustenburg . Auguste Viktoria stayed at Glücksburg frequently, because her sister Caroline Mathilde was married to Friedrich Ferdinand and Auguste Viktoria visited her often. A series of rooms on the first floor are named after the Empress. Even Wilhelm II was a frequent guest, but rarely spent the night, instead sleeping on his yacht during his stays. From 1907 to 1910, Wilhelm II had the Mürwik Naval School built in the neighboring Mürwik. The School, built for the Imperial Navy, was nicknamed the Red Castle and was based on the model of the Malbork Castle.

Glücksburg Castle remained the main residence of the ducal family until the 20th century. Only gradually did the family move to the mansions of the surrounding estates, such as Louisenlund or Grünholz.

World wars 
The structures of the Glücksburg Castle made it through the world wars without suffering any substantial damages. Only the castle's bells were seized and melted down during World War I.

Towards the end of World War II, under the Doenitz administration, Germany moved the seat of Government to Mürwik in the city of Flensburg. During this period, Albert Speer resided inside the castle. Here he was arrested by the allied forces on May 23, 1945, and brought to Flensburg. Until the summer of 1945, the castle was used as a prison for 200 former members of the Wehrmacht. In May 1945, British troops looted the castle, and took numerous valuables, many of which were later returned. Furthermore, 32 caskets in the tomb had been opened. While the looting took place, British troops detained the family of Friedrich Ferdinand zu Schleswig-Holstein-Sonderburg-Glücksburg at gunpoint. The return of the looted items followed a proclamation by the Queen of England, who is the niece of Friedrich Ferdinanfd.

The reopening of the castle and the museum occurred in 1948, on the Christian holiday of Pentecost.

Foundation and museum 

In 1922, the family brought the castle into a foundation, the purpose of which was not only to preserve Glücksburg, but also to allow the public to participate in the cultural monument. As part of this, a large part of the castle was converted into a museum, and concerts and other cultural events have been held in the castle and in the orangery. One of the venues for the Schleswig-Holstein Musik Festival is at Glücksburg Castle.

In the non-profit foundation statutes, the task of the foundation is formulated as follows:

The purpose of the foundation is to promote art and culture as well as monument protection. The purpose of the foundation is realized in particular through the endeavor to preserve Glücksburg Castle and the inventory belonging to the foundation's assets in accordance with their high cultural and historical status, to use them and make them accessible to the public. ...

The board of directors of the foundation is provided by the ducal family itself. The current managing director is Christoph zu Schleswig-Holstein, who has held this office since 1980. In addition to the family, the board of trustees also includes representatives of the state of Schleswig-Holstein and the district administrator of the Schleswig-Flensburg district. The family still has the domiciliary rights. The foundation is responsible for the care and protection of the castle, which - like many water castles - has to struggle with constant moisture. As a last major measure - after a legal dispute with the state regarding the assumption of costs - the facades of Glücksburg were extensively renovated from 2005. Half of the financial resources of around 440,000 euros were provided by the EU and the other half by the State Office for the Preservation of Monuments, the German Foundation for Monument Protection, the Friends of Schloss Glücksburg e. V. and various smaller foundations.

Construction history

Construction contract 
On December 21, 1582, a contract was signed with Nikolaus Karies for the construction of the castle. Johann III assigned Karies with the demolition of the monastery and lead the work on the new building. The Duke provided him with 6,000 Luebian marks for the construction work - which at that time was the equivalent of around 1200 cattle.

Glücksburg Castle was built in the immediate vicinity of the former monastery. Some materials from the monastery were reused as building material for the new castle. The former monastery grounds were flooded and dammed up into a large castle pond.

Typical mansion in Schleswig-Holstein 
Occasionally French models are cited as the inspiration behind the castle - the floor plan of the castle is similar to the central building of Chambord - but it is a typical building of its era and region. The architecture is typical for Schleswig-Holstein from the Middle Ages and the Renaissance. "Sister buildings" can be found, for example, in the  Nütschau Priory and above all in Ahrensburg Castle, which was built almost simultaneously. Glücksburg Castle is the largest and probably most well known structure of this form of Schleswig-Holstein architecture. The motto of the builder Johann III was G ott g ebe G lück m it F rieden (God Gives Luck With Peace). The letters G G G M F are therefore placed above the main entrance. The name of the castle is derived from this motto. Glück means luck, and Glücksburg thus means Luck Castle.

The building was built in a stylistic transition period. While Johann's uncle Adolf I, for example, built more modern, three-winged buildings, with the Husum Castle or the Reinbek Castle, the nephew stuck to more traditional building forms of the region. And although it was planned and executed as a manorial residence, the location in the water, the embrasure like openings in the tower basements, the originally merlon towers and the high-lying first floor and the now-gone drawbridge of the courtyard still remind of a past in which a noble residence also had to be fortified.

Execution 
The building stands on a 2.5-meter-high granite base and rises directly out of the water. The castle is made of white plastered brick, which was largely removed and reused from the demolished monastery. The base area is a square with an edge length of almost 30 meters, consisting of three individual houses, each with its own floor plan and roof. While the middle house accommodated the large halls and the vestibule, the two side houses were fitted with the living rooms. The palace chapel, with its east-facing altar wall, is the only room that was placed across the overall floor plan and is located in the east and middle house at the same time.

In the four corners of Glücksburg Castle are four octagonal towers, each seven meters in diameter. The courtyard side of the castle is also preceded by two bay-like stair towers, which form the only connection between the upper floors. In total, the castle includes two halls, the vestibule, the castle chapel and twelve middle rooms, twelve tower rooms and eleven corner rooms. The total living space of the building is around 3,000 m2 (32290 sq. ft.).

The gable ends of the facades as well as the wall dormers were once curved and provided with decorative elements typical of the Renaissance, but these decorations were removed in the course of a classicist purification in the 19th century, resulting in the current, somewhat austere appearance of the castle. In 1768 the middle roof received the baroque ridge turret, the wall dormers removed in the 19th century were renewed from 1906 onwards. Aside from changes to the decorations, the exterior of the castle has remained largely unchanged for more than 400 years.

Interiors 
The floors of the castle were once assigned to different functions. The design of most of the rooms goes back to the Baroque era, only some of the paintings from the time of construction have survived. Most of the furnishings in the palace were auctioned off in 1824 after the death of Anna Carolina or transferred to Berlin after the events of 1864. The furniture that can be viewed today is stylistically mostly from the 19th century and was brought here from Gottorf Castle and Kiel Castle. It is one of the richest collections of this kind in Schleswig-Holstein.

Basement 
In the basement, which is about halfway below the water level, the kitchen and various storage rooms used to be located. The basement rooms have their own entrances so that staff or visitors to the palace chapel, which was later made public, did not have to enter the vestibule. The former prison is located under the entrance area on the first floor, but it was probably never used for this purpose.

Basement and chapel 
The basement contains the main entrance and is accessed via the castle bridge. The portal, framed by the stair towers, leads directly into the entrance hall, the vestibule known as the Green Hall. The green hall was always furnished in a very simple way, but the floor is remarkable, with its footplates which are made of Öland stone and show imprints of fossils in many places. The rooms adjoining the vestibule were once used as a chancellery and later also as living rooms; today the castle administration is housed here.

The most remarkable room in the basement is the palace chapel. The chapel hall is the only room in the castle that extends over two of the long houses. It takes up a good quarter of the east and middle houses. In addition, the floor level of the chapel extends down to the basement, making it the only room that takes up more than one floor.

The church was originally furnished in the Renaissance style and still contains a pulpit altar and a baptism from the middle of the 17th century, both works by Claus Gabriel. Under Duke Philipp Ernst, the chapel was furnished in a baroque style around 1717, and in 1847 it received a Marcussen organ . During restoration work in 1973, frescos from the time the castle was built were uncovered. To the west of the chapel is the house crypt in which the last burial took place in 1811 and in which 38 members of the ducal family are buried. In the castle chapel is a smoke barrel from the 13th century, the last known artifact from the destroyed monastery church.

The chapel also served as the official parish church of the city of Glücksburg until 1965. It is still used today for church services, weddings and baptisms. In the western tower room of the basement, civil weddings can be carried out in consultation with the castle administration.

First floor with the Red Hall 

The first floor is the actual living area; the ducal family's bedrooms and salons have been located here since it was built. The eastern rooms were originally assigned to the duke, the western rooms to his wife. However, this division was not maintained permanently.

In the center of the floor is the richly furnished Red Hall (including paintings by Antoine Pesne). The room got its name from the red wallpaper it was once covered in. The 30 meter long, ten meter wide and four meter high hall extends over the entire floor area of ​​the central building. The ornamentation of the vault is one of the earliest stucco works in Schleswig-Holstein. The room served as a salon and living room as well as a ballroom of the castle. It also served as a hallway, as four rooms lead off from it on each side of the Hall. Behind the corner rooms of the outer houses are the salons of the tower rooms. The Empress Tower and the Empress Salon are reminiscent of Auguste Viktoria.

Second floor 
Not much is known about the use of the second floor at the time of construction, but it is believed that it was originally mainly used as a storage room and granary. This function resulted from the fact that in the time of John III, a tax in kind was quite common. The floor plan follows the floor below: the middle house is also dominated by a large hall, with four rooms and the tower rooms adjoining each side. From the 18th century onwards, the floor contained a few guest rooms. The so-called Margrave's Room is a reminder of Margrave Frederick Ernest, who served as governor of Schleswig-Holstein and temporarily lodged at Glücksburg. From 1857 the living quarters of the princes and princesses were set up on the upper floor.

The middle White Hall lacks the vaulted ceiling of its "red" counterpart, which makes it appear larger and deeper. The hall is now less elaborately furnished, the most important decoration is a collection of tapestries from 1740. The White Hall was often used as a dining room and is now used for concert performances.

Surroundings

Farm yard 
In front of the castle is a farm yard, which opens up as an outer bailey with a gatehouse, cavalier house and stables in front of the actual main building. For the farm yard, Johann III In 1585, gave the builder Karies another 1,600 Luebian marks. The yard was completed in 1587. Like the castle itself, the buildings of the farm yard are also typical of the rural architecture of the Schleswig-Holstein nobility at the time of the Renaissance. The outer bailey was partially destroyed in a fire in 1717, mainly the bakery and brewery that once bordered the fourth side of the courtyard facing the castle. The brewery was not rebuilt and an avenue was planted in its place. The lanterns in the courtyard are noteworthy, they come from the royal Amalienborg Palace in Copenhagen and were erected in 1859.

The gatehouse once connected the island of the farm yard to the mainland via a drawbridge, this bridge was later exchanged for a fixed crossing. In addition to the actual main entrance to the castle area, the gatehouse was primarily used as a stable building and coach house . Today it houses the museum shop and ticket office.

The twelve-axis cavalier's house from 1685, facing west, was raised by one floor in the 18th century, and the curved gables of the attic were not added until 1856. As on the castle, the decorations were later removed again. Today the cavalier's house is used for private purposes and is inhabited.

Garden 

Already during the time of the Rüdekloster, the monastery had a garden, which was lost after the grounds were laid down and the castle pond was dammed. With the exception of a kitchen garden from 1622, the palace was only given a larger park area in the 18th century. Under the gardener Jürgen Lorentzen, a small pleasure garden was laid out on the site of the later rose garden from 1706 to 1709. Since Glücksburg is surrounded by water on three sides and the outer bailey is in front of the fourth side, the larger park was placed behind the outer bailey from 1733 without direct reference to the castle. This baroque garden essentially consisted of a large parterre, which was aligned with an orangery building erected in 1743.

in the 19th century, under the Duchess Anna Carolina, the formal decoration of the garden was abandoned, and the green areas were redesigned, inspired by English gardens . The baroque structure was largely retained, so that the framing avenues and the path system of the old garden have been preserved to this day. The orangery was renewed and received its present form in 1827. It is a classicist building with five axes, which is unusual for the region, with a small portico in the center. The orangery is now used for art exhibitions and concerts.

The garden area is open all year round and accessible to visitors free of charge.

Rose garden 
The Glücksburger Rosarium was set up in 1990 and 1991 right next to the palace garden, on the site of the former palace gardening facility. The former gardener's house forms the focal point. In the rosarium over 500 historical, English, climbing and wild roses are cultivated on an area of just under one hectare.

The rosarium is no longer part of the public castle grounds and is privately managed, so access is chargeable.

Castle pond 
The castle pond was artificially created in the 16th century by damming the water of the Schwennau and Munkbrarupau. It was supposed to protect the castle and at the same time served as a fish pond for food supply. As a result of the flooding, the former monastery grounds sank completely, the castle and the outer bailey were both completely surrounded by water after the complex was completed. Over the centuries, sediment created a permanent connection between the castle and the outer bailey.

In 1962, 1969 and most recently in 2005, the pond was drained so that renovation work could be carried out on the palace facades. The foundations of the monastery church and the remains of a hypocaust system were discovered and excavations were made. Some of the exhibits from the excavations are on display in the castle.

Trivia 

 The King of Norway Harald V, the Queen of Denmark Margrethe II, and the Spanish Queen Sophia are all living members of the House of Gluecksburg.
 Germany's northernmost castle was the setting of the TV-show Der Fuerst und das Maedchen. In the show the castle is named "Schloss Thorwald" and serves as the residence of a fictitious Duke. The first usage of the castle as a movie set was in 1937, when it was used in the Ibsen-production of "Ein Volksfeind"
 1977–1982, the Deutsche Bundespost issued a definitive series of stamps depicting German castles. Schloss Gluecksburg was featured on the 10-pfennig stamp, single colour grey. The castle was also featured on the 45-cent stamp of a set of two multicolour commemorative stamps showing castles by the Deutsche Post AG in 2013.
 Schloss Glucksburg was selected to be one of the 23 castles in the videogame Stronghold. However, the castle in the videogame is only loosely based on the real castle.

Literature 

 Henning von Rumohr: Schlösser und Herrenhäuser im Herzogtum Schleswig. Droemer Knaur, 1983.
 Wolfgang J. Müller: Schloß Glücksburg. Bauform als fürstlicher Machtanspruch. In: Oswald Hauser, Waltraud Hunke, Wolfgang J. Müller: Das Haus Glücksburg und Europa. Mühlau, Kiel 1988, S. 71–87.
 Dehio: Handbuch der Deutschen Kunstdenkmäler Hamburg, Schleswig-Holstein. Deutscher Kunstverlag, München 1994.
 Wolfgang J. Müller: Schloß Glücksburg (Große Baudenkmäler, Heft 145). 19. Auflage, München/Berlin 1995.
 Adrian von Buttlar, Margita Marion Meyer (Hrsg.): Historische Gärten in Schleswig-Holstein. 2. Auflage. Boyens & Co., Heide 1998, S. 265–269.
 Johannes Habich, Deert Lafrenz, Heiko K. L. Schulze, Lutz Wilde: Schlösser und Gutsanlagen in Schleswig-Holstein. L & H, Hamburg 1998, .
 Eva von Engelberg-Dočkal: Kulturkarte Schleswig-Holstein. 1000mal Kultur entdecken. 2. Auflage, Wachholtz-Verlag, Neumünster 2005, .
 Wolfgang Bauch: Prospektionen im See des Glücksburger Wasserschlosses – Die Entdeckung des Rudeklosters. In: Denkmal. Zeitschrift für Denkmalpflege in Schleswig-Holstein. 13/2006, S. 34–36.
 Hans u. Doris Maresch: Schleswig-Holsteins Schlösser, Herrenhäuser und Palais. Husum Verlag, Husum 2006.
 Heiko K. L. Schulze:  Die Bauten des Rudeklosters in Glücksburg im 13. Jahrhundert – Zur Architektur der Zisterzienser in Norddeutschland. In: Denkmal. Zeitschrift für Denkmalpflege in Schleswig-Holstein. 13/2006, S. 40–48.
 Rolf Glawischnig:  Auf der Suche nach dem Glücksburger Rudekloster. In: Denkmal. Zeitschrift für Denkmalpflege in Schleswig-Holstein. 13/2006, S. 31–33.
 Astrid Hansen:  Schloss Glücksburg – Kalkanstrich in Fortsetzung alter Tradition. In: Denkmal. Zeitschrift für Denkmalpflege in Schleswig-Holstein. 14/2007, S. 128.
 Wolfgang Bauch:  Archäologische Funde des Rudeklosters in Glücksburg – Ergebnisse der Oberflächenbegehungen von 2005. In: Denkmal. Zeitschrift für Denkmalpflege in Schleswig-Holstein. 19/2012, S. 98–105.

External links 

 Schloss Glücksburg
 Museen in Schleswig-Holstein – Schloss Glücksburg
 Rosarium Glücksburg
 Luftaufnahme des Schlossbereichs mit eingeze ss Glücksburg als 3D-Modell im 3D Warehouse von SketchUp
 Gartentafeln des Landesamtes für Denkmalpflege Schleswig-Holstein (PDF-Datei; 297 kB)
 Schloss Glücksburg bei Burgenarchiv.de

References

British World War II crimes
Renaissance architecture in Germany
Castles in Schleswig-Holstein
Museums in Schleswig-Holstein
Gardens in Schleswig-Holstein
Historic house museums in Germany
Water castles in Germany
Buildings and structures in Schleswig-Flensburg